Kooper Session is the second-in-line of the Super Session albums featuring singer-songwriter Al Kooper. Joining Kooper in the guitar slot is 15-year-old phenomenon Shuggie Otis, son of rhythm and blues pioneer Johnny Otis.

Divided into two halves, "The Songs" (a quartet of arranged gospel and rhythm and blues tracks) and "The Blues" (a trio of improvised blues tracks), the album, like Super Session before it, was quickly recorded and featured short, succinct tracks ("Double or Nothing", "One Room Country Shack") and fluid, drawn out jams highlighting the talents of the artists ("12:15 Slow Goonbash Blues", "Bury My Body").

Track listing

Charts

Personnel

Musicians
 Al Kooper – organ (all tracks), vocals (tracks 1, 3-4), piano (tracks 1, 4)
 Shuggie Otis – guitar
 Stu Woods – electric bass (tracks 1-5, 7)
 Wells Kelly – drums (tracks 1-5, 7)
 Mark Klingman – piano (tracks 2, 5, 7)
 The Hilda Harris-Albertine Robinson Singers – backing vocals (tracks 1, 4)

Technical
 Al Kooper – producer, liner notes
 Doug Pomeroy – engineer
 Roy Segal – engineer
 Lloyd Ziff – design, photography
 Myra Zeller, Sandy Speiser – additional photography

References

1970 albums
Columbia Records albums
Al Kooper albums
Collaborative albums
Shuggie Otis albums
Albums produced by Al Kooper